Randolph is a city in Riley County, Kansas, United States.  As of the 2020 census, the population of the city was 159.

History
Randolph was originally called Waterville, and under the latter name was laid out in 1856. It was renamed Randolph in honor Gardner Randolph, a pioneer settler.

Randolph was originally located a mile east of its present location. The only town to rebuild elsewhere was Randolph, where the streets are named after the submerged towns.

The ruins of the original town are visible on the north side of Kansas Highway 16 as it crosses the lake. The downtown of the original settlement is above the waterline on an island in the marshes at the northern tip of the lake. The island is occasionally accessible by foot when Fancy Creek is low, but the channels of Fancy Creek and the Big Blue River shift frequently making access to the ruins unpredictable. This is locally known as "Old Randolph."

Geography

Climate
The climate in this area is characterized by hot, humid summers and generally mild to cool winters.  According to the Köppen Climate Classification system, Randolph has a humid subtropical climate, abbreviated "Cfa" on climate maps.

Demographics

Randolph is part of the Manhattan, Kansas Metropolitan Statistical Area.

2010 census
As of the census of 2010, there were 163 people, 71 households, and 43 families residing in the city. The racial makeup of the city was 96.9% White and 3.1% from two or more races. Hispanic or Latino of any race were 4.9% of the population.

There were 71 households, of which 31.0% had children under the age of 18 living with them, 50.7% were married couples living together, 7.0% had a female householder with no husband present, 2.8% had a male householder with no wife present, and 39.4% were non-families. 33.8% of all households were made up of individuals, and 14.1% had someone living alone who was 65 years of age or older. The average household size was 2.30 and the average family size was 3.00.

The median age in the city was 36.5 years. 25.2% of residents were under the age of 18; 5.5% were between the ages of 18 and 24; 28.2% were from 25 to 44; 28.8% were from 45 to 64; and 12.3% were 65 years of age or older. The gender makeup of the city was 44.2% male and 55.8% female.

2000 census
As of the census of 2000, there were 175 people, 77 households, and 41 families residing in the city. The racial makeup of the city was 97.14% White, 0.57% Native American, and 2.29% from two or more races. Hispanic or Latino of any race were 0.57% of the population.

There were 77 households, out of which 26.0% had children under the age of 18 living with them, 45.5% were married couples living together, 6.5% had a female householder with no husband present, and 45.5% were non-families. 41.6% of all households were made up of individuals, and 20.8% had someone living alone who was 65 years of age or older. The average household size was 2.27 and the average family size was 3.24.

In the city, the population was spread out, with 25.7% under the age of 18, 5.7% from 18 to 24, 27.4% from 25 to 44, 21.1% from 45 to 64, and 20.0% who were 65 years of age or older. The median age was 40 years. For every 100 females, there were 101.1 males. For every 100 females age 18 and over, there were 109.7 males.

The median income for a household in the city was $21,875, and the median income for a family was $50,313. Males had a median income of $21,563 versus $21,458 for females. The per capita income for the city was $13,666. About 9.3% of families and 9.3% of the population were below the poverty line, including 3.7% of those under the age of eighteen and 20.7% of those 65 or over.

Education
The community is served by Blue Valley USD 384 public school district.

Notable people
 Cassandra Peterson, actress who played Elvira, Mistress of the Dark on TV and film

See also
 Tuttle Creek Lake

References

External links
 City of Randolph
 Randolph – Directory of Public Officials
 Randolph city map, KDOT

Cities in Kansas
Cities in Riley County, Kansas
Manhattan, Kansas metropolitan area